Pachydota ducasa is a moth of the family Erebidae. It was described by William Schaus in 1905. It is found in Venezuela.

References

Phaegopterina
Moths described in 1905